Adil Rami (born 27 December 1985) is a French professional footballer who plays as a centre-back for  club Troyes, for which he is the captain.

Rami began his football career playing for amateur club Étoile Fréjus Saint-Raphaël, then known as ES Fréjus. Due to only playing the sport as a hobby, he spent three seasons at the club playing in the Championnat de France amateur, the fourth division of French football. In 2006, Rami ascended three divisions after signing with Ligue 1 club Lille. At Lille, Rami developed into a starter, making his professional debut in May 2007. He is nicknamed "Shrek" by teammates and Lille supporters. In January 2011, Rami joined Spanish club Valencia on a four-year contract. However, he was immediately loaned back to his previous club and was a part of the Lille team which won the league and cup double.

Despite constant early inquiries from Morocco prior to his first selection, Rami chose to play for his home country of France. He was in the preliminary list to play for France at the 2010 FIFA World Cup finals but did not make the final squad. Rami made his senior debut on 11 August 2010 in a friendly match against Norway.

Early life
Rami was born in the city of Bastia on the island of Corsica to Moroccan parents. As a youth, his family moved to the mainland, eventually settling in the southern coast city of Fréjus, where his mother worked as a member of the city council. Rami is the third of four children and has two sisters and one brother. While training to become a professional football player, Rami worked for the city after his family grew concerned for his future. He often did odd-jobs such as taking care of the maintenance and cleanliness of the city.

Club career

Early career
Rami registered as a youth player for Étoile Fréjus Saint-Raphaël, then known as ES Fréjus, in 1994 at the age of nine. Despite harbouring ambitions of playing football professionally, Rami only played the sport as a hobby and worked for city hall to support himself. He made his amateur debut for the club during the 2003–04 season while Fréjus were playing in the Championnat de France amateur, the fourth division of French football. He appeared in four matches in his first season. In the 2004–05 season, Rami appeared in 24 matches as Fréjus finished mid-table.

Ahead of the 2005–06 season, Rami switched to playing in central defence. He initially played as an offensive player often in the midfield, but following an injury to a teammate, whom Rami described as his best friend, his coaches inserted him into defence. The transition was a success, with Rami appearing in 30 matches with Fréjus finishing mid-table for the third consecutive season. Midway through the campaign, Rami was offered a trial by professional club Lille. Eager to leave the amateur club, he took the opportunity and after a week's training session with Lille, which Rami described as "hard", he was signed to an amateur contract with Fréjus receiving €10,000.

Lille
Upon his arrival to the club, Rami was inserted onto the club's Championnat de France amateur team and was supervised by coach Pascal Planque, who Rami stated gave him the best opportunity to grow as a player. Rami appeared in 27 matches as the team finished in third position, the highest finish amongst professional clubs' reserve team's playing in the group. With two months remaining in the 2006–07 Ligue 1 season, Rami was called up to the senior team by manager Claude Puel. He made his professional debut on 19 May 2007 in a Ligue 1 match against Auxerre, starting at centre-back. The following week, Rami started again, against Rennes. On 4 June, Rami signed his first professional contract after agreeing to a three-year deal lasting until 2010. He was then promoted to the senior squad on a permanent basis and assigned the number 23 shirt.

In the 2007–08 season, Rami was declared a starter by Puel and inserted at centre-back, alongside captain Grégory Tafforeau. In the opening match of the season, against Lorient, Rami featured in the match until the 69th minute, when he suffered an injury to ligaments in one of his knees. He subsequently missed three-and-a-half months due to the injury, returning in November 2007. Upon his return, Rami featured in every remaining match for Lille, save for one league match. Lille finished the campaign in seventh position, one spot out of Europe. After the season, Rami signed a two-year contract extension with the club.

For the 2008–09 season, Rami's Ligue 1 season debut against Nancy was halted in injury time after earning a straight red card. On 18 October 2008, he scored his first professional goal in a 2–2 draw against Lyon. The following month, Rami scored against Marseille in another 2–2 draw. On 1 February 2009, he scored the would-be game-winner against Bordeaux in the 57th minute. However, the goal was canceled out eight minutes later by Yoann Gourcuff to draw the match at 2–2. Rami's fourth and final goal of the season was the team's second goal in a 3–2 win over Nancy on the final day of the league season. The victory secured fifth place for Lille, which resulted in the club qualifying for the newly created UEFA Europa League.

Following the season, Rami drew considerable interest from several clubs, which included French clubs Marseille and Lyon, English clubs Liverpool and Arsenal and Italian club Milan. Despite suitable offers for the player, Lille chairman Michel Seydoux declared that Rami was not going to be leaving the club after a reported move to Marseille for €12 million was abruptly canceled in July 2009. The announcement led to a distraught and angry Rami declaring he would see out the rest of his contract with Lille playing in the reserves if he was not transferred. He even went as far as to state that there was a conspiracy between Lille and Lyon, due to the club's easy negotiations during transfers between each other, as well as Seydoux's brother, Jérôme, being a shareholder of Lyon. On 15 August 2009, Rami apologized for the comments and said he would remain at Lille.

Rami began the 2009–10 season again as a starter as Lille struggled early on due to its tough schedule, in which the team faced Marseille, Paris Saint-Germain and Toulouse in the first four weeks of the season. He made his UEFA Europa League debut on 30 July 2009 in the first leg of the club's third qualifying round match. Rami scored his first goal of the season on 19 September in the annual Derby du Nord match against Lens. With Lille trailing 1–0 in injury time at a hostile Stade Félix-Bollaert, Rami connected on a header following a corner kick in the 93rd minute to draw the match at 1–1, which was the final result. On 28 October, he scored his second goal against Saint-Étienne in a 4–0 victory after delivering a curling free-kick from almost 35 metres out. On 25 February 2010, Rami scored the aggregate-winning goal in the team's round of 32-second leg tie away to Fenerbahçe after connecting on a header five minutes from time.

Valencia
On 3 January 2011, Spanish club Valencia confirmed on its website it had reached an agreement with Lille for the transfer of Rami, with the La Liga outfit paying Lille a reported transfer fee believed to be in the range of €6–10 million. Rami finished the 2010–11 campaign with Lille on loan from Valencia and officially joined his parent club on 13 June after successfully passing a medical.

Rami made his debut for Valencia against Racing de Santander in a 4–3 home win. In the same match, he scored his first goal for the club from a corner kick, making it 2–3.

AC Milan
On 25 September 2013, Valencia temporarily suspended Rami from his contract after he gave an interview on Radio Valencia in which he openly criticised his teammates and his coach, Miroslav Đukić. He was also fined €275,000 (€130,000 net) of his remaining salary owed for the half of the season, the largest ever imposed by Valencia. Meanwhile, Rami left the Spanish club and started training with AC Milan. On 16 October 2013, Valencia gave him permission to train with the Italian club and an agreement was reached between the clubs that the player would be loaned to Milan when the winter transfer window opened, on 3 January 2014, with an option to purchase.

On 6 January 2014, Rami made his debut in Serie A, coming on as a substitute for Cristián Zapata in a match against Atalanta, a 3–0 win. On 1 February, he scored his first goal in Serie A, against Torino. On 23 February, he scored his second goal against Sampdoria. His third and last goal of the Serie A season came on 16 March, against Parma.

On 12 July 2014, Milan signed Rami on a three-year contract with a £3.37 million (€4.25 million) fee to Valencia. Rami personally paid €500,000 to cover the payment difference with Valencia, as Milan refused to pay the original buy-out clause of €7.5 million, only offering €3.75 million. He scored his first goal in the 2014–15 season on 28 September 2014 with a glancing header in a 1–1 draw with Cesena.

Sevilla
On 1 July 2015, Spanish newspaper Marca confirmed that Sevilla had reached an agreement with Milan to sign Rami for four seasons, with the transfer fee believed to be €3.5 million.

Marseille

On 13 July 2017, Rami joined Ligue 1 club Olympique de Marseille on a four-year contract for a €6 million transfer fee. On 27 July, he made his competitive debut for Marseille, in their 2017–18 UEFA Europa League third qualifying round, first leg match against Oostende at the Stade Vélodrome, playing the full 90 minutes of the 4–2 victory. He made his Ligue 1 debut for Marseille on 6 August in their home match against Dijon, again playing the full 90 minutes of the match, which Marseille won 3–0. On 14 September, he headed home Dimitri Payet's corner to score his first competitive goal for Marseille in their 2017–18 UEFA Europa League group stage 1–0 home win over Konyaspor. On 3 May 2018, he played every minute of the Europa League semi-final second leg match away to FC Red Bull Salzburg which Marseille lost 2–1 after extra-time but won 3–2 on aggregate to secure a place in the 2018 UEFA Europa League Final which was played at the Parc Olympique Lyonnais in Décines-Charpieu, Lyon, France on 16 May 2018, against Atlético Madrid. Rami played the full 90 minutes of the final, which Atlético Madrid won 3–0.

On 11 November 2018, Rami scored his first Ligue 1 goal of the 2018-19 season and also assisted the opening goal that was scored by Lucas Ocampos in the 2–0 home win over Dijon. On 19 December, Rami missed the last penalty of the penalty shoot-out of the 2018–19 Coupe de la Ligue round of 16 home match against Strasbourg, resulting in Marseille's elimination from the competition.

Rami was left out of Marseille's pre-season tour to the United States in the summer of 2019 and left out of the squad for the club's opening competitive match of the 2019–20 season on 10 August 2019 under newly appointed head coach André Villas-Boas, a 2–0 Ligue 1 home defeat to Stade de Reims. On 13 August 2019, Rami was sacked by Marseille for 'gross misconduct'. He had been under investigation by the club for missing a training session at the end of the 2018–19 season after claiming that he had an injury. But on the same day as the missed training session, Rami took part in the recording of an episode of the French TV game show Fort Boyard where contestants compete in a set of challenges to win prize money, including participation in a variation of mud wrestling and performing demanding physical stunts.

Fenerbahçe
On 27 August 2019, 2 weeks after being sacked by Olympique de Marseille for 'gross misconduct' and as a free agent, Rami signed a short-term contract with Turkish Süper Lig club Fenerbahçe that would run until the end of the 2019–20 season and included the option of a second season.

Sochi
On 21 February 2020, by mutual agreement with the club, he terminated his contract with Fenerbahçe and joined the Russian team PFC Sochi on the same day. While the championship was stopped because of the COVID-19 pandemic, his contract was terminated on 27 May 2020 without him having played a single match. Rami claims not to have been paid.

Boavista
After terminating his contract with Sochi, Rami went to Portugal's top flight by joining Boavista on a two-year deal on 4 September 2020 meeting his friend Ricardo Costa. He played 22 games and left by mutual accord the following 29 July.

Troyes
On 24 August 2021, Rami signed with Ligue 1 side Troyes on a one year deal.

International career

Rami is a French international, having made his debut on 11 August 2010 in a friendly match against Norway. Prior to representing France, he drew interest from the Moroccan national team. Ahead of the 2008 Africa Cup of Nations, Rami was offered a chance to play with Morocco at the competition by manager Henri Michel. However, Rami declined the offer, citing his ambition to play for France. He has stated on several occasions that he would prefer to "represent Morocco within the France team".

On 20 March 2008, Rami received his first call-up to the France national team by then head coach Raymond Domenech for a friendly match against England. Rami was informed of the call-up by Lille teammate and captain Rio Mavuba, which Rami initially considered a joke. The call-up was indeed considered surprising by the French media and supporters, as Rami had only played 17 Ligue 1 matches. Rami featured with the B team in its friendly against Mali on 25 March 2008. Due to the match being unofficial, Rami was again offered the chance to play for Morocco after being called up for the team's friendly match against the Czech Republic on 11 February 2009 by new manager Roger Lemerre. Rami again declined the opportunity. On 19 March, he was called up again by Lemerre for the team's FIFA World Cup qualification match against Gabon. For the third time, Rami declined the opportunity and later accepted his call-up to the France squad for its FIFA World Cup qualification matches against Lithuania. On 11 May 2010, despite having not made a single appearance for France, Rami was named to the 30-man preliminary list by Domenech to play in the 2010 FIFA World Cup finals, but failed to make the final 23-men squad.

On 5 August 2010, Rami was called up to the senior team by the new manager Laurent Blanc for the team's friendly match against Norway on 11 August 2010. He earned his first senior cap in that match, starting at centre-back alongside Philippe Mexès. After appearing regularly in UEFA Euro 2012 qualifying, on 29 May 2012, Rami was named to the squad to participate in the finals of that competition. Two days earlier, he had scored his first international goal in a 3–2 friendly comeback win over Iceland. Rami made his debut in the finals of a World Cup or UEFA European Championship on 11 June in his team's Euro 2012 opening match against England. He started and played the entire match, which ended in a 1–1 draw. He also played every minute of France's last three matches of the tournament – the remaining two Group D matches against Ukraine and Sweden, and the quarter-final against defending champions – and eventual winners – Spain.

Rami took part in the finals of the UEFA Euro 2016 tournament, called up to replace the injured Raphael Varane, Rami played every minute of the first four matches (group stage and round of 16) of the finals, against Romania, Albania, Switzerland and the Republic of Ireland. However, he did not play the quarter-final, semi-final and final matches against Iceland, Germany and Portugal respectively. The host-nation France finished as runners-up of the tournament after losing to Portugal 1–0 after extra time in the final.

On 17 May 2018, Rami was called up to the 23-man French squad for the 2018 World Cup finals in Russia. He announced his retirement from the national team after winning the trophy. Rami was the only unused outfield player in that tournament.

Despite his retirement announcement, Rami was named in Deschamps' squad for three of the four league phase matches of the inaugural 2018–19 UEFA Nations League against Germany and the Netherlands. He was an unused substitute for all those three matches, with France failing to reach the finals that was held in Portugal.

Personal life
Rami is the father of twins, Zayn and Madi (b. 2016), with former companion Sidonie Biémont. In 2017, he began dating Canadian actress Pamela Anderson and as of November 2018, the two were living together in a mansion in Cassis, near Marseille, in the French Riviera. In June 2019, Anderson accused him of domestic abuse in an Instagram post, and that they had ended their relationship.

Career statistics

Club

International

As of 27 May 2012

Honours
Lille
Ligue 1: 2010–11
Coupe de France: 2010–11

Sevilla
UEFA Europa League: 2015–16

France
FIFA World Cup: 2018

Individual
UNFP Ligue 1 Team of the Season: 2010–11
UEFA Europa League Squad of the Season: 2015–16

Orders
Knight of the Legion of Honour: 2018

References

External links

 
 

Ciberche stats and bio 

1985 births
Living people
French sportspeople of Moroccan descent
Sportspeople from Bastia
Footballers from Corsica
French footballers
Association football central defenders
ÉFC Fréjus Saint-Raphaël players
Lille OSC players
Valencia CF players
A.C. Milan players
Sevilla FC players
Olympique de Marseille players
Fenerbahçe S.K. footballers
PFC Sochi players
Boavista F.C. players
ES Troyes AC players
Championnat National 2 players
Ligue 1 players
La Liga players
Serie A players
Süper Lig players
Primeira Liga players
UEFA Europa League winning players
France international footballers
UEFA Euro 2012 players
UEFA Euro 2016 players
2018 FIFA World Cup players
FIFA World Cup-winning players
French expatriate footballers
French expatriate sportspeople in Spain
French expatriate sportspeople in Italy
French expatriate sportspeople in Turkey
French expatriate sportspeople in Russia
Expatriate footballers in Spain
Expatriate footballers in Italy
Expatriate footballers in Turkey
Expatriate footballers in Russia
Expatriate footballers in Portugal
Chevaliers of the Légion d'honneur
Sportspeople from Fréjus
Footballers from Provence-Alpes-Côte d'Azur